Gnophaela aequinoctialis is a moth of the family Erebidae. It was first described by Francis Walker in 1854 and is found in Texas, Mexico, Nicaragua and Venezuela.

The wingspan is approximately 48 mm.

References

 

Gnophaela
Moths described in 1854